Michel Breuer (born 25 May 1980 in Gouda) is a retired Dutch footballer who, during his career, played in his home country for Excelsior, SC Heerenveen, NEC Nijmegen and Sparta Rotterdam. His father, Martin Breuer, played professionally for FC Den Bosch in the 1980s.

Club career

Youth career
Michel Breuer started to play football at his local football club in Haastrecht, at the age of 11. He moved to GCFC Olympia where he stayed for a year before joined the Youth academy of Rotterdam side Excelsior.

SBV Excelsior
Breuer played his professional game for Excelsior on 3 May 1999, against FC Dordrecht in a 2-1 loss. Following this, Breuer broke into the first team squad week after week. He made over 100 league appearances for Excelsior.

SC Heereveen
Breuer had previously worked at a local secondary school in Heerenveen as a security guard. In summer 2004 he moved to SC Heerenveen. He became captain of the Heerenveen team at the start of the 2008–09 Eredivisie season. In July 2012 Breuer left Heerenveen after eight years and 300 matches in all competitions and signed with NEC from Nijmegen.

NEC Nijmegen
However, the defender played less than 40 games over the course of two years and he signed on loan for Sparta Rotterdam in 2014.

Sparta Rotterdam
After his contract had expired with NEC in June 2014, he signed a permanent deal to return to Rotterdam for a third time. His no-nonsense, wholehearted playing style won him a cult-hero status with their supporters. This meant he earned himself the captaincy and after one promotion, a cup win and over 550 games in all competitions, Breuer retired from the professional game. However, it was slightly overshadowed by the fact Sparta were relegated back to the Eerste Divisie via the playoffs.

Honours

Club
SC Heerenveen
KNVB Cup: 2009

Sparta Rotterdam
 Eerste Divisie: 2015-16

References

External links
 Voetbal International profile 

 

1980 births
Living people
Footballers from Gouda, South Holland
Association football central defenders
Dutch footballers
Excelsior Rotterdam players
SC Heerenveen players
NEC Nijmegen players
Sparta Rotterdam players
Eerste Divisie players
Eredivisie players